Detudamo is a surname. Notable people with the surname include:

Angelita Detudamo (born 1986), Nauruan tennis player
Buraro Detudamo (1931–1994), Nauruan politician, son of Timothy
Timothy Detudamo (died 1953), Nauruan politician and linguist